Paul Joseph Vermeerschis a Canadian poet.

His first collection, Burn (2000), was a finalist for the Gerald Lampert Award. His subsequent collections, The Fat Kid (2002), Between the Walls (2005), The Reinvention of the Human Hand (2010, a finalist for the Trillium Book Award), and Don't Let It End Like This Tell Them I Said Something have all garnered critical praise.

From 1998 to 2003, Vermeersch organized the reading series at the I.V. Lounge in downtown Toronto, hosting authors from across North America. During that time he edited the anthology The I.V. Lounge Reader (2001) for Insomniac Press. From 2002 until 2011 he was the poetry editor for the press. He is now senior editor of Wolsak and Wynn Publishers Ltd.

Vermeersch teaches at Sheridan College in Mississauga.

Bibliography 
What You Wish Wasn't True, Wayward Armadillo, 1999. (chapbook)
Burn, ECW Press, 2000.
The I.V. Lounge Reader, 2001. (editor)
The Fat Kid, ECW Press, 2002.
Widows & Orphans, Junction Books, 2003. (chapbook)
Between the Walls, McClelland and Stewart, 2005.
The Al Purdy A-frame Anthology, Harbour Publishing, 2009. (editor)
The Reinvention of the Human Hand, McClelland and Stewart, 2010.
Don't Let It End Like This Tell Them I Said Something, ECW Press, 2014.

References

External links
Paul Vermeersch's Blog
Wayward Armadillo Press
Junction Books
Insomniac Press
Interview with Paul Vermeersch in Taddle Creek Magazine
Interview with Paul Vermeersch in The Danforth Review
"He Will Not Drown His Sorrows" from Between the Walls, online at CBC Words at Large

Living people
Canadian male poets
Canadian people of Flemish descent
Academic staff of Sheridan College
20th-century Canadian male writers
20th-century Canadian poets
Year of birth missing (living people)